Lichenomphalia umbellifera or the green-pea mushroom lichen is a species of basidiolichen in the family Hygrophoraceae. It is regarded as nonpoisonous.

The mushroom is yellowish-tan and hygrophanous, and occurs throughout most of the year on damp soil and rotting wood. It can be found in the Northern Hemisphere, particularly in the region of the Arctic. Its cap grows up to 3cm wide. Its stalk is 1–3cm tall and 1–3mm wide. The spores are white or yellowish.

Taxonomy

The species was first described by Carl Linnaeus in 1753 as Agaricus umbelliferus. It was transferred to Lichenomphalia in 2002.

Similar species
Similar species include Chromosera cyanophylla, Chrysomphalina aurantiaca, Chrysomphalina chrysophylla, Contumyces rosellus, and Rickenella fibula.

References

Hygrophoraceae
Lichen species
Lichens described in 1753
Lichens of North America
Taxa named by Carl Linnaeus
Basidiolichens
Lichens of Europe
Lichens of the Arctic